Alois Stadlober (born 11 April 1962 in Judenburg) is an Austrian former cross-country skier who competed from 1988 to 2000. He earned two medals at the 1999 FIS Nordic World Ski Championships with a gold in the 4 x 10 km relay and a silver in the 10 km.

Stadlober's best individual finish at the Winter Olympics was an eighth in the 10 km event at Albertville in 1992. He won four races in his career, all in 10 km and in Austria, from 1995 to 1997.

He is married to former alpine skier Roswitha Steiner and is the father of cross-country skiers Luis Stadlober and Teresa Stadlober.

Cross-country skiing results
All results are sourced from the International Ski Federation (FIS).

Olympic Games

World Championships
 2 medals – (1 gold, 1 silver)

World Cup

Season standings

Individual podiums
2 podiums

Team podiums

 2 victories 
 3 podiums

Note:   Until the 1999 World Championships, World Championship races were included in the World Cup scoring system.

References

External links

1962 births
Living people
People from Judenburg
Austrian male cross-country skiers
Olympic cross-country skiers of Austria
Cross-country skiers at the 1984 Winter Olympics
Cross-country skiers at the 1988 Winter Olympics
Cross-country skiers at the 1992 Winter Olympics
Cross-country skiers at the 1994 Winter Olympics
Cross-country skiers at the 1998 Winter Olympics
FIS Nordic World Ski Championships medalists in cross-country skiing
Sportspeople from Styria
20th-century Austrian people